Girl Next Door, or variants, may refer to:

 Girl next door, a young female stock character who is often used in romantic stories

Film and television

Film 
 The Girl Next Door (1953 film), an American musical comedy
 The Girl Next Door (1998 film), a TV movie starring Tracey Gold
 The Girl Next Door (1999 documentary), featuring porn star Stacy Valentine
 The Girl Next Door (1999 TV movie), a drama starring Polly Shannon
 The Girl Next Door (2004 film), an American romantic comedy
 The Girl Next Door (2007 film), an American horror drama, based on Ketchum's novel

Television
 The Girls Next Door, an American reality TV series
 Girl Next Door (anime), a 2000 Japanese erotic original video animation
 "The Girl Next Door" (Veronica Mars), an episode of the TV show 
 The Girl Next Door, a web series of The Office American TV series

Literature 
 The Girl Next Door (Ketchum novel), by Jack Ketchum, 1989
 The Girl Next Door (Rendell novel), a novel by Ruth Rendell, 2014

Music 
 Girls Next Door, an American country music group
 Girl Next Door (band), a Japanese music trio
 Girls Next Door, a South Korean pop group in Idol Drama Operation Team

Albums
 The Girl Next Door (album), by Evelyn King, 1989
 Girl Next Door (Girl Next Door album), 2008
 Girl Next Door (Saving Jane album), 2005

Songs
 "The Girl Next Door", a variant of the 1944 popular song "The Boy Next Door"
 "The Girl Next Door", a song from the 1954 film Athena 
 "Girl Next Door" (Musiq Soulchild song), 2001
 "Girl Next Door", 2003, a song by Merril Bainbridge
 "Girl Next Door" (Saving Jane song), 2005
 "Girl Next Door", a song by Alessia Cara from the 2018 album The Pains of Growing
 "Girl Next Door", a song by Bobby Brown from the 1986 album "King of Stage"
 "Girl Next Door", a song by Brandy Clark from the 2016 album Big Day in a Small Town
 "Girl Next Door", a song by Lee Matthews from the 2015 album It's a Great Day to Be Alive
 "Girl Next Door", a 2013 song by Massad
 "Girl Next Door", the theme song for My Babysitter's a Vampire, 2011
 "The Girl Next Door", a song by Screeching Weasel from the 1995 album Kill the Musicians
 "Girl Next Door", a 2021 track by Toby Fox from Deltarune Chapter 2 OST from the video game Deltarune
 "Girl Next Door", a song by Trixie Mattel from the 2020 album Barbara

See also 

 Boy Next Door (disambiguation)